Holy See and Indonesia established diplomatic relations in 1950. Relations are important as part of global interfaith dialogue, because Indonesia has the world's largest Muslim-majority population. Indonesia recognizes Roman Catholicism as one of its six approved religions. The Holy See has a nunciature in Jakarta, while Indonesia has an embassy in Rome.

History
There have been relations between the Holy See and Indonesia since the era of the Majapahit empire. Between 1318 and 1330 CE, Mattiussi, a Franciscan friar, visited several places in today's Indonesia: Sumatra, Java, and Borneo. He was sent by the Pope to launch a mission into the lands of Mongols in the Asian interior. In his report, he described the marvelous palace of the Javanese King and the war with the Great Khan of China. It was the court of Majapahit king Jayanegara in Trowulan that was visited by Mattiussi.

During the colonial era of the Dutch East Indies, some parts of Indonesia, such as Flores, were known as Catholic-majority areas. During colonial times, most Europeans residing in the Dutch East Indies were Protestants; however, the teachings of the Catholic Church began to spread there in the 19th century.   In 1947, Vatican established an Apostolic Delegation in Indonesia (then Dutch East Indies) with a Dutch government permit. The Holy See recognized the Republic of Indonesia on 16 March 1950 and put an apostolic delegate in the country.   Official relations between the Republic of Indonesia and Holy See were established in 1950, after independence from the Netherlands, with the status of Apostolic Internunciatur.   In December 1965, the status changed to Nunciatur Apostolic.

There have been two papal visits to Indonesia: those of Pope Paul VI in December 1970, and of Pope John Paul II in October 1989. They both paid a courtesy visit to President Suharto. During his visit, Pope John Paul II celebrated a Mass and addressed a crowd of 130,000 Indonesian Catholics congregated in Gelora Bung Karno Stadium. Since September 2017, the Apostolic Nunciature to Indonesia has been assigned to Archbishop Piero Pioppo.

See also
 Catholicism in Indonesia

References

External links
 Embassy of Republic of Indonesia to the Holy See

 
Bilateral relations of Indonesia
Indonesia